Ataköy Athletics Arena, is an indoor sporting arena for track and field athletics events located in Ataköy, Istanbul, Turkey.

Construction

The venue was built for the 2012 IAAF World Indoor Championships. It is situated next to the larger Sinan Erdem Dome which host's basketball among other sports. The arena was the first indoor athletics venue in the country.

As part of Istanbul bid for the 2020 Summer Olympics, it was the planned venue for the judo and taekwondo events.

Facilities
Ataköy Athletics Arena has a  oval track with six lanes, a  straight track with eight lanes for track events, and shot put, high jump, pole vault, long/triple jump sectors for field events.

It has a total seating capacity of 7,450 consisting of 5,040 spectator seats, 590 VIP seats, 206 VVIP seats, 141 seats with tables for TV commentators, 230 seats with tables for press, and 144 seats with desks for photo editors and press. In addition, there are 560 seats for team stands and 60 seats for coaches.

Events hosted

See also 
List of indoor arenas in Turkey

References

External links 

Sport in Bakırköy
Sports venues in Istanbul
Indoor arenas in Turkey
Athletics (track and field) venues in Turkey
Indoor track and field venues
Sports venues completed in 2012
Music venues in Istanbul
2012 establishments in Turkey